Bill Fay (born William Fay; September 9, 1943) is an English singer-songwriter. His early recordings were released by Deram, but following the release of his second album in 1971, Fay was dropped by the label. His work enjoyed a growing cult status in the 1990s, and his older works were re-issued in 1998 and 2004/2005. Fay's 2012 album Life Is People was his first album of all-new material since 1971. His most recent album, Countless Branches, was released on 17 January 2020.

Biography

Early career
Fay was born in north London, where he still lives.

His first single, "Some Good Advice" / "Screams in the Ears", was issued on the Deram label in 1967, and was followed by two albums, Bill Fay in 1970 and Time of the Last Persecution in 1971. The recordings did not sell well, and Fay was dropped from Deram soon after the release of his second album. They were re-issued in 1998, and then again in 2005.

Despite returning to the recording studio in the late 1970s,  Tomorrow, Tomorrow & Tomorrow, the follow-up to Time of the Last Persecution was not released until January 2005, following the reissues of his earlier works.

Cult status and comeback
Bill Fay's work enjoyed a growing cult status in the 1990s. His first two albums were re-issued in 1998, an event which Bill Fay described in 2012 as follows:

In 2004, the British label Wooden Hill released a collection of demos recorded between 1966 and 1970 entitled From the Bottom of an Old Grandfather Clock. In 2005, his late 1970s recordings were released in January 2005. Entitled Tomorrow, Tomorrow & Tomorrow, it was credited to the Bill Fay Group and was released on the Durtro Jnana label.

The compilation album Still Some Light appeared on the Coptic Cat label in 2010, a double CD containing a mix of older material and newer, home-recorded songs.

Released on 21 August 2012 on Dead Oceans, Life is People was his first new studio LP in over 40 years.

Who Is the Sender?, a new album by Bill Fay was released in April 2015. The second album track, "War Machine", came out as a single in February 2015.

A feature article entitled "Bill Fay Was a Hidden Gem. One Musician Made Finding Him a Mission" was published in the New York Times on January 15, 2020.

His most recent album, Countless Branches, was released on 17 January 2020.

Covers and appreciation
The American band Wilco has played Fay's song "Be Not So Fearful" in live performances and the band's singer, Jeff Tweedy, can be heard singing it in the documentary, I Am Trying to Break Your Heart: A Film About Wilco. Fay has joined the band and Tweedy onstage for the rendition of the song at shows at the Shepherd's Bush Empire in 2007, and at the Union Chapel, Islington in 2010 respectively, both in London.

The English singer-songwriter and pianist John Howard recorded a cover version of the song "Be Not So Fearful" for his E.P. Songs for the Lost and Found (2008). The song "Be Not So Fearful" was also covered by Ed Harcourt on the benefit compilation album Songs to Save a Life - In Aid of Samaritans (2011).

A cover version of Fay's "Pictures of Adolf Again", by producer and musician Jim O'Rourke and Wilco drummer Glenn Kotche, can be heard in the film from Kōji Wakamatsu, United Red Army. The title track of "Time of the Last Persecution" became a live standard of the British Apocalyptic folk group, Current 93.

The band Okkervil River covered Fay's song "Plan D" on their Golden Opportunities 2  EP in 2011.

The American band The War on Drugs covered Fay's song "I Hear You Calling" at shows throughout 2014.

His song "Be Not So Fearful" was covered by A.C. Newman in 2014, and was used in the episode "Us" of The Walking Dead.

In 2008 the English singer Marc Almond recorded a live version of "Cosmic Boxer" and it was released on his album In 'Bluegate Fields': Live at Wilton's Music Hall.

Discography

Albums
 Bill Fay (Deram, 1970) 
 Time of the Last Persecution (Deram, 1971)
 Tomorrow, Tomorrow & Tomorrow (recorded 1978-1981; Durtro, 2005)
 Life Is People (Dead Oceans, 2012) 
 Who Is the Sender? (Dead Oceans, 2015)
 Countless Branches (Dead Oceans, 2020)

Compilation albums
 From the Bottom of an Old Grandfather Clock (recorded 1966-1970; Wooden Hill, 2004)
 Still Some Light (2CD, recorded 1970, 1971, 2009; Coptic Cat, 2010) / new edition: Still Some Light Pt. 1 (1CD / 2LP) & Still Some Light Pt.  2 (1CD / 2LP) (Dead Oceans, 14/01/2022) (compilation of early 1970–1971 studio recordings and 2009 new material home recordings)

Notes

References

External links

Fansite & info
 The only dedicated Bill Fay site
 Dead Oceans, Bill Fay
Interviews
 Robert Leeming, A Conversation with Bill Fay – Part One
 Linda Wertheimer, Bill Fay: A Cult Figure Returns, Skeptical But Optimistic, interview with Bill Fay
 aquarium drunkard, Bill Fay :: The Aquarium Drunkard Interview
Videoclips
 Video of John Howard's 2008 cover version of Bill Fay's "Be Not So Fearful"

1943 births
Living people
20th-century English singers
20th-century British male singers
21st-century English singers
21st-century British male singers
21st-century pianists
British male pianists
Dead Oceans artists
Deram Records artists
English male singers
English pop pianists
English pop singers
English songwriters
Singers from London
British male songwriters